Maksym Dehtyarov (born 30 May 1993) is a Ukrainian professional footballer who plays as a striker for Taraz.

Club

Metalurh Donetsk
A product of the FC Stal Alchevsk youth sporting school in the Ukrainian First League, he moved to Metalurh Donetsk in 2013 and played one match in the 2013–14 UEFA Europa League against Kukësi at the Qemal Stafa Stadium in Tirana.

Olimpik Donetsk 
In summer 2018 he moved from FC Poltava to Olimpik Donetsk. In the 2018–19 season he scored 8 goals.

Desna Chernihiv 
In summer 2019 he moved on loan to newly-promoted Ukrainian Premier League club Desna Chernihiv. On 19 October 2021 he scored his first goal for the club against Zorya Luhansk.

Return to Olimpik Donetsk 
In winter 2019–20 he returned to Olimpik Donetsk in the Ukrainian Premier League. On 4 March 2020 he scored against Desna Chernihiv at the Lobanovsky Dynamo Stadium. On 12 March 2020 he scored against Mariupol and on 16 March 2020 he scored against Lviv.

Return to Desna Chernihiv 
On 12 August 2020 he signed a two-year contract with Desna and qualified for the Europa League third qualifying round. On 27 September he scored his first goal for Desna against Rukh Lviv, adding two more against the same opponent three days later in the Ukrainian Cup. On 10 December 2021 he scored against Inhulets Petrove.

Taraz 
In summer 2022 he moved to Taraz in the Kazakhstan Premier League. On 22 July 2022 he made his debut for his new club against Aktobe in the Kazakhstan Cup, replacing Abilayhan Zhumabek in the 67th minute. On 31 August 2022 he helped Taraz qualify for the semifinal of the 2022 Kazakhstan Cup in a penalty shootout victory over Shakhter Karagandy.

Career statistics

Club

Honours
FC Poltava
 Ukrainian First League: 2017–18

Metalurh Donetsk
 Ukrainian Cup: Runner-Up 2011–12
 Ukrainian Super Cup: Runner-Up 2012

Individual
 Top Scorer Ukrainian First League: Runner-up 2017–18 (15 goals)
 Best Player round 28 Ukrainian First League: 2017–18

References

External links 
 Profile on Official FC Desna Chernihiv website
 
 

Ukrainian footballers
FC Stal Alchevsk players
FC Metalurh Donetsk players
FC Kramatorsk players
Association football forwards
Ukrainian Premier League players
Ukrainian First League players
Kazakhstan Premier League players
FC Poltava players
FC Olimpik Donetsk players
FC Desna Chernihiv players
FC Taraz players
1993 births
Living people
People from Kirovsk, Luhansk Oblast
Sportspeople from Luhansk Oblast
Expatriate footballers in Kazakhstan
Ukrainian expatriate sportspeople in Kazakhstan